Carolyn Reeder (November 16, 1937 – January 20, 2012) was an American writer best known for children's historical novels. She also wrote three non-fiction books about Shenandoah National Park for adults together with her husband. She won the Scott O'Dell Award for Historical Fiction. During the last year of her life she wrote a column for children in The Washington Post (KidsPost) about Civil War history.

Carolyn Bruce Owens was born in Washington, D.C. She studied organ and voice at American University where she graduated in 1959 with a degree in music. She lived in Glen Echo, Maryland. She was afflicted by kidney cancer and died in a Washington hospital.

Works
Shades of Grey (1989). 
 
 

Captain Kate, Avon Books, 1999, 
Before the Creeks Ran Red, HarperCollins, 2003, 
The Secret Project Notebook, Los Alamos Historical Society, 2005, 

Non-fiction
Shenandoah Heritage,
Shenandoah Vestiges,
Shenandoah Secrets, Potomac Appalachian Trail Club, 1991

References

External links
 
 Biography at publisher HarperCollins
 

1937 births
2012 deaths
American children's writers
American historical novelists
American University alumni
People from Glen Echo, Maryland
People from Washington, D.C.
American women children's writers
American women novelists
20th-century American novelists
20th-century American women writers
Women historical novelists
21st-century American women